Walter II of Avesnes (b. 1170 – d.1244) was lord of Avesnes, Leuze, of Condé and Guise, and through his marriage to Margaret of Blois, he became count of Blois and Chartres. He was the son of James of Avesnes, and Adèle, lady of Guise.

Walter fought alongside Count Ferdinand of Flanders at the Battle of Bouvines in 1214, then left to fight in the Holy Land. Taken prisoner, he was ransomed by the Knights Templar and helped construct the Pilgrim Castle, in 1218, donating 1,000 Saracen bezants towards its construction.

With the income from Guise lands, he began work on modernizing his castles. He also built a castle Englancourt to control the road through the county of Hainaut.

Family
Walter married Margaret, Countess of Blois and Chartres, daughter of Theobald V, Count of Blois, count of Blois and Chartres, and Alix of France. Their children:
 Theobald, died young
 Mary, Countess of Blois († 1241), married Hugh I, Count of Blois, (1196 † 1248).
 Isabelle, married John, lord of Oisy and Montreuil

References

Lords of Avesnes
Avesnes family
Christians of the Fifth Crusade